Tanot Mata is a temple in the western state of India in District Jaisalmer of Rajasthan.
Goddess Aavad, the daughter of Mamadia Charan (Gadhvi), is worshiped as Tanot Mata. 
As per the oldest Charan literature, Tanot Mata is an incarnation of divine goddess Hinglaj Mata. 
The village is close to the border with Pakistan, and is very close to the battle site of Longewala of the Indo-Pakistani War of 1971. Contemporary folklore credits the temple for the outcome of the battle. Tourists cannot go beyond this temple to see the Indo–Pak Border unless one gets the relevant documentation in advance from the District and Military Authorities. It is now a tourist destination in India. The area is said to have oil and gas reserves.

History

A priest of the temple mentioned the history of the temple.
A long time ago there was a man named Mamadia Charan, who had no 'son-daughter' i.e. no child. He traveled completely on foot to Hinglaj Mata about seven times to attain a child. One night, when the Hinglaj Mata asked Mamadiya Charan (Gadhvi) in her dream, whether you want a son or a daughter, Charan said that you should take birth at my house.
By the grace of Hinglaj Mata, seven daughters and one son were born at that house. One of these was Aavad Mata, who is known as Tanot Mata.

The temple was constructed and the idol of the reigning deity was installed by the Bhati Rajput King Tanu Rao in 828 AD. Since then, the temple has been revered and worshipped by the Bhati Rajputs and the people of Jaisalmer for generations.

Tanot was attacked by the Pakistan Army during the Indo-Pakistani War of 1965 during which 3,000 bombs were fired towards the temple. However, as per local lore, the bombs either missed their target or did not explode. After the 1965 war, India's Border Security Force (BSF) took charge of the temple and the responsibility of managing and maintenance.

Tanot was attacked again during the Indo-Pakistani War of 1971, but this time the attacking tanks got bogged down in the sand, allowing the Indian Air Force to destroy them. After the 1971 war, the Indian Army built a Vijay Stambha (Victory tower) inside the temple compound to commemorate the victory in the Battle of Longewala.

Location 
The area has a high average windspeed and as a result there are now a large number of wind-based renewable energy projects in the area. The road to Tanot is surrounded with miles and miles of sand dunes and sand mountains. The temperatures in the area can go up to 49 °C and ideal time to visit the place is from November to January.

In popular culture
 The shelling on Tanot Mata during 1971 Indo-Pak War was depicted in 1997 Bollywood war film Border.
 Hindi news channels like Zee News and Aaj Tak depicted Tanot Mata in their documentaries on the 1965 and 1971 Indo-Pak wars.

References

Temples in Rajasthan
Hindu temples in Rajasthan
Villages in Jaisalmer district
Charan
Cāraṇa Sagatī